Hedwigia is a genus of mosses belonging to the family Hedwigiaceae.

The genus was first described by Palisot de Beauvois in 1804.

The genus has cosmopolitan distribution.

Species:
 Hedwigia ciliata
 Hedwigia stellata

References

Bryopsida
Moss genera